A special election was held in  to fill a vacancy left by the resignation of John Brown (DR) to accept a position as clerk of the county court of Queen Anne's County.  Brown had earlier been re-elected to the 12th Congress, thus, his resignation created vacancies in both the 11th and 12th Congresses.  Unusually, a single ballot was used for both vacancies.  This was the first of at least three examples of this sort of dual-vacancy being filled with one ballot.

Election results

Robert Wright took his seat December 3, 1810 at the start of the Third Session of the 11th Congress.

See also
List of special elections to the United States House of Representatives

References

Maryland 1810 07
Maryland 1810 07
1810 07
Maryland 07
United States House of Representatives
Maryland 1810 07
United States House of Representatives 1810 07